Leif Stenberg has been the Dean of the Institute for the Study of Muslim Civilisations at the Aga Khan University (International) in London since April 2017.

Media Appearances 

Stenberg provided commentary during the Jyllands-Posten Muhammad cartoons controversy. He also appeared on live television to comment on the roots and developments of the Arab Spring.

List of Publications 

 Sternö A., L. Stenberg & B. Knutsson (1988), Vetenskap och teknik i Arabvärlden. STU, Stockholm. .
 Stenberg, L. (1996), The Islamization of Science: Four Muslim Positions Developing an Islamic Modernity. Almqvist & Wiksell International, Stockholm. .
 Stenberg, L. (1999), Muslimer i Sverige - Lära och Liv. Bilda förlag, Stockholm. .
 Schaebler B. & L. Stenberg, eds. (2004), Globalization and the Muslim World: Culture, Religion, and Modernity. Syracuse University Press, Syracuse. .
 Raudvere C. & L. Stenberg, eds. (2009), Sufism Today. Heritage and Tradition in the Global Community. I.B. Tauris, London. 
 Koch, C. & L. Stenberg, eds. (2010), The EU and the GCC: Challenges and Prospects under the Swedish EU Presidency. Gulf Research Center, Dubai. .
 Otterbeck, Jonas & Leif Stenberg (2012), Islamologi: Studiet av en religion. Carlssons, Stockholm.
 Hooglund, Eric & Leif Stenberg, eds. (2012), Navigating Contemporary Iran. Challenging Economic, Social and Political Perceptions. Routledge Advances in Middle East and Islamic Studies, Routledge, London.
 Salamandra, Christa & Leif Stenberg, eds. (2015), Syria from Reform to Revolt Vol. II: Culture, Society and Religion. Syracuse University Press, Syracuse.
 Rickard Lagervall & Leif Stenberg (2016), Muslimska Församlingar och Föreningar i Malmö och Lund – en ögonblicksbild. Rapport, Centrum för Mellanösternstudier, Lunds universitet.

References 

Living people
1959 births
British scholars of Islam
Academic staff of Lund University
Religion academics
Middle Eastern studies scholars